Salon Music is a Japanese new wave/rock duo consisting of Hitomi Takenaka (竹中仁見) and Zin Yoshida (吉田仁). The group have released twelve studio albums between 1983 and 2011. As of 2020 their most recent album was Sleepless Sheep in 2011.

Band members
 Hitomi Takenaka - electronic drums, keyboards, programming, synthesizer, vocals
 Zin Yoshida - guitar, bass, synthesizer, vocals

Discography
Studio albums
 My Girl Friday (1983, Canyon)
 La Paloma Show (1984, Canyon)
 Topless (1985, Canyon) (mini-album)
 This is Salon Music (1987, Moon Records)
 O Boy (1988, Moon)
 Psychic Ball (1990, Alfa)
 M*A*S*H (1995, Trattoria, Polystar)
 Chew It In A Bite (1996, Trattoria, Polystar)
 Kelly's Duck (1997, Trattoria, Polystar)
 Round Five Shaggy Bee (1999, Trattoria, Polystar)
 New World Record (2002, Trattoria, Polystar)
 Sleepless Sheep (2011, Felicity)

Compilation albums
 Missing And Wishing 1980-1983 (1993, Pony Canyon)
 Girls At Our Tratt's Best! (1998, Trattoria, Polystar)
 This Is + O Boy (2002, EastWest Japan)
 Anthology (Salon Music Best) (2003, Pony Canyon)

References

External links
Official website
Official page by felicity label

Japanese indie pop groups
Japanese pop music groups
Japanese alternative rock groups
Japanese musical duos
Musical groups established in 1980
1980 establishments in Japan
J-pop music groups
Pony Canyon artists